Floyd John "Ted" Welch (October 17, 1892 – January 6, 1943) was a Major League Baseball pitcher, who appeared in three games as a relief pitcher for the St. Louis Terriers of the Federal League in 1914.

References

Major League Baseball pitchers
St. Louis Terriers players
Keokuk Indians players
Baseball players from Kansas
1892 births
1943 deaths
People from Wilson County, Kansas
People from Great Bend, Kansas